The Canton of Offranville is a former canton situated in the Seine-Maritime département and in the Haute-Normandie region of northern France. It was disbanded following the French canton reorganisation which came into effect in March 2015. It had a total of 17,886 inhabitants (2012).

Geography 
An area of farming and light industry in the arrondissement of Dieppe, centred on the town of Offranville. The altitude varies from 0m (Hautot-sur-Mer) to 129m (Arques-la-Bataille) for an average altitude of 73m.

The canton comprised 18 communes:

Ambrumesnil
Arques-la-Bataille
Aubermesnil-Beaumais
Le Bourg-Dun
Colmesnil-Manneville
Hautot-sur-Mer
Longueil
Martigny
Offranville
Ouville-la-Rivière
Quiberville
Rouxmesnil-Bouteilles
Saint-Aubin-sur-Scie
Saint-Denis-d'Aclon
Sainte-Marguerite-sur-Mer
Sauqueville
Tourville-sur-Arques
Varengeville-sur-Mer

Population

See also 
 Arrondissements of the Seine-Maritime department
 Cantons of the Seine-Maritime department
 Communes of the Seine-Maritime department

References

Offranville
2015 disestablishments in France
States and territories disestablished in 2015